Mieczysławów may refer to the following places:
Mieczysławów, Łódź Voivodeship (central Poland)
Mieczysławów, Masovian Voivodeship (east-central Poland)
Mieczysławów, Świętokrzyskie Voivodeship (south-central Poland)